Ludwig Raiser (27 October 1904 – 13 June 1980) was a German legal scholar.

In 1961, he was one of the signatories of the Memorandum of Tübingen on West German foreign policy.

He was President of the Synod of the Evangelical Church in Germany from 1970 to 1973.

He was the father of Konrad Raiser, General Secretary of the World Council of Churches.

References 

 https://www.deutsche-biographie.de/gnd118597957.html

Corresponding Fellows of the British Academy
1904 births
1980 deaths
Knights Commander of the Order of Merit of the Federal Republic of Germany
German legal scholars
German Protestants